Glen Thomas Bennett is a New Zealand politician and a member of the Labour Party. He was elected the Member of the Parliament for New Plymouth at the 2020 New Zealand general election, defeating the National candidate and incumbent Jonathan Young. Prior to entering politics, he worked in the community sector for more than 20 years.

Early life
Bennett was born in Dunedin. His parents were officers in The Salvation Army and frequently moved around the country. He attended Dominion Road School in Auckland, Shirley Boys' High School in Christchurch, and Rongotai College in Wellington. He spent two years working in television production, including such shows as Showcase, Fair Go, and McPhail and Gadsby. After witnessing poverty in Donetsk, Ukraine on a trip with the Salvation Army in 2002, Bennett decided to foster troubled teen boys.

Political career

Bennett was a member of the local New Plymouth Labour Party branch for over five years prior to his selection. In late 2019, Bennett ran unopposed for the Labour nomination for the New Plymouth seat, after serving on the local electorate executive for the previous two years.

At the 2020 general election, New Plymouth was not tipped as a seat to flip to Labour, with the party not having held the seat since 2008. On the night, Bennett defeated the incumbent National Party MP Jonathan Young by a final margin of 2,555 votes .

Personal life 
Bennett is openly gay, and became engaged to fiancé Jon O'Neill after a proposal on stage at a Troy Kingi concert in New Plymouth. During the 2020 campaign, Bennett was accosted by a member of the public about his sexuality, which led to Andrew Little stepping in to stop the abuse. After being delayed twice due to the COVID-19 pandemic, Bennett and O'Neill were married in Parliament on 8 February 2021, the day before Bennett's maiden speech.

References

External links 
 Glen Bennett on Facebook

Living people
1970s births
Year of birth missing (living people)
New Zealand Labour Party MPs
LGBT members of the Parliament of New Zealand
Gay politicians
LGBT Christians
Politicians from Dunedin
People educated at Shirley Boys' High School
People educated at Rongotai College